Syria and weapons of mass destruction deals with the research, manufacture, stockpiling and alleged use by Syria of weapons of mass destruction, which include chemical and nuclear weapons.

On 14 September 2013, the United States and Russia announced an agreement for the elimination of Syria's chemical weapon stockpiles by June 2014. In October 2013, the OPCW-UN Joint Mission destroyed all of Syria's declared chemical weapons manufacturing and mixing equipment. Several months later, Syria disclosed that it maintained a ricin chemical weapons program, which the Syrian government claims has fallen into the hands of Syrian Opposition forces in the east of the country. The following month Syria, further disclosed that it had 4 more previously hidden chemical weapons production sites. The Israeli intelligence community believes the Syrian government retains several tons of chemical weapons.

Syria sought to develop nuclear weapons with help from North Korea, but its plutonium production reactor was destroyed by the Israeli Air Force in 2007 (see Operation Orchard).  The Syria file at the International Atomic Energy Agency (IAEA) remains open, amid Syria's failure to respond to the IAEA's questions about the destroyed facility, that the IAEA concluded was "very likely" a nuclear reactor, including the whereabouts of the reactor's nuclear fuel. In January 2015, it was reported that the Syrian government is suspected to be building a nuclear plant in Al-Qusayr, Syria.

Background 
Following the Israeli occupation of the Golan Heights during the 1967 Six-Day War, and South Lebanon in 1978, the Syrian government has regarded Israeli military power as a threat to Syrian security. Syria first acquired chemical weapons from Egypt in 1973 as a military deterrent against Israel before launching the Yom Kippur War. Despite the fact that Syrian officials did not explicitly declare the chemical weapons capability, they implied it through speeches and in addition warned of retaliations. Internal Syrian chemical weapons capability may have been developed with indirect Russian, German, Chinese technical and logistical support. It is likely Syria imported dual-use chemical weapon precursors and production equipment from West Europe, China and North Korea.

In 1997, security analyst Zuhair Diab, who worked for the Syrian Ministry of Foreign Affairs as a diplomat from 1981 to 1985, wrote that Israeli nuclear weapons were a primary motivation for the Syrian chemical weapons program. Their rivalry with Iraq and Turkey were also important considerations.

On 23 July 2012 Syria implicitly confirmed it possessed a stockpile of chemical weapons which it says are reserved for national defense against foreign countries.

During the Syrian Civil War, in August 2012, the Syrian military restarted chemical weapons testing at a base on the outskirts of Aleppo. Chemical weapons were a major point of discussion between the Syrian government and world leaders, with military intervention being considered by the West as a potential consequence of the use of such weapons.

Chemical weapons

Syria's chemical weapons program
Syria's chemical weapons program began in the 1970s with weapons and training from Egypt and the Soviet Union, with production of chemical weapons in Syria beginning in the mid-1980s. In the July 2007 Syrian arms depot explosion, there were suggestions that the incident involved a secret chemical weapons facility.

Prior to September 2013 Syria was one of a handful of states which had not ratified the Chemical Weapons Convention, and had not publicly admitted to possessing chemical weapons, although Western intelligence services believed it to hold a massive  stockpile. In September 2013, French intelligence put the Syrian stockpile at 1,000 tonnes, including Yperite, VX and "several hundred tonnes of sarin". After international condemnation of the August 2013 Ghouta chemical attack, for which Western states held the Syrian government responsible (whilst Syria and Russia held the Syrian rebels of the Syrian civil war responsible), in September 2013 Syria joined the Convention (formally acceding on 14 October), as part of its agreement to the destruction of its chemical weapons under the supervision of the Organisation for the Prohibition of Chemical Weapons. In October 2013, the OPCW found a total of 1,300 tons of chemical weapons.

On 16 October 2013, the OPCW and the United Nations formally established a joint mission to oversee the elimination of the Syrian chemical weapons program by mid-2014, which was declared completed in January 2016. According to Reuters, a chemical analysis done in January 2018 on the destroyed stockpile samples match some chemical markers such as hexamine, unique to the Syrian recipe for sarin, with samples from the 21 August 2013 Ghouta attack and also from interviewees' samples from Khan Sheikhoun and Khan Al-Assal attack sites.

Syrian opposition chemical weapons capability
The Syrian government claims that the opposition has the capacity to launch large chemical attacks such as those seen at Ghouta. Sources such as the United States and Human Rights Watch disagree, claiming there is no significant evidence the opposition has any significant chemical weapons capability.

A Syrian military source told SANA, the official news agency in Syria, that the Syrian Army seized two containers with sarin together with automatic rifles, pistols and homemade bombs (IEDs) in a rebel hideout in the al-Faraieh neighborhood (also spelled Al-Faraya) of the city of Hama on 1 June 2013, which has been the scene of fighting between government troops and armed opposition groups. The Syrian government declared the two cylinders "as abandoned chemical weapons" and told the OPCW that "the items did not belong to" them. On 14 June 2014, the Joint OPCW-UN Mission confirmed that the cylinders contained sarin. On 7 July 2014, the UN Secretary-General Ban Ki-Moon informed the UN Security Council about the findings.

In December 2013 investigative journalist Seymour Hersh controversially reported that multiple U.S. intelligence agencies had allegedly produced top secret assessments in the summer of 2013, regarding  Syrian rebel's supposed chemical weapons capabilities. The alleged assessments were said by Hersh to have concluded that the Al-Nusra Front and Al-Qaeda in Iraq were capable of acquiring, producing, and deploying sarin gas "in quantity". A spokesman for the Director of National Intelligence replied that Hersh's report was "simply false."

On 8 April 2016, a spokesman for the rebel group said that "weapons not authorized for use in these types of confrontations" had been used against Kurdish militia and civilians in the Sheikh Maqsood neighborhood in Aleppo. He stated that "One of our commanders has unlawfully used a type of weapon that is not included in our list". He did not specify what substances were used but, according to the Kurdish Red Crescent, the symptoms were consistent with the use of chlorine gas or other agents. Welat Memo, a physician with the Kurdish Red Crescent, said that the people affected are "vomiting and having difficulty in breathing." Jaysh al-Islam subsequently clarified that it was referring to "modified Grad rockets," not chemical weapons.

ISIS mustard gas use
The BBC reported in September 2015 that, according to an unnamed U.S. official, the U.S. believes that ISIS had used powdered mustard agent at least four times in Syria and Iraq, that ISIS had probably manufactured the mustard agent itself, and probably had an active chemical weapons research team. Mustard agent is a relatively simple chemical weapon to manufacture, and given the Syrian government's chemical-weapons disarmament, analysts deemed it unlikely that ISIS had acquired the mustard agent from seizing a Syrian government cache. The BBC further stated that a BBC team on the Turkey-Syria border had seen corroborating evidence.

Biological weapons 
Syria is generally considered not to have biological weapons.
However, there are some reports of an active biological weapons research and production program. According to NATO Consultant Dr Jill Dekker, Syria has worked on: anthrax, plague, tularemia, botulism, smallpox, aflatoxin, cholera, ricin and camelpox, and has used Russian help in installing anthrax in missile warheads. She also stated "they view their bio-chemical arsenal as part of a normal weapons program".

Nuclear program 

Syria has been a party to the Nuclear Non-Proliferation Treaty (NPT) since 24 September 1969, and has a limited civil nuclear program. In 1991 China sold a miniature neutron source reactor called SRR-1 to Syria. Before the start of the Syrian Civil War Syria was known to operate only the Chinese reactor. Despite claiming to be a proponent of a Weapons of Mass Destruction Free Zone (WMDFZ) in the Middle East (Syria has not handed a letter confirming its support for WMDFZ), Syria was accused of pursuing a military nuclear program with a reported nuclear facility in a desert Syrian region of Deir ez-Zor. The reactor's components were believed to have been designed and manufactured in North Korea, with the reactor's striking similarity in shape and size to the North Korean Yongbyon Nuclear Scientific Research Center. The nuclear reactor was still under construction.

That information alarmed Israeli military and intelligence to such a degree that the idea of a targeted airstrike was conceived, resulting in Operation Outside the Box on 6 September 2007 that saw as many as eight Israeli aircraft destroying the facility. Israeli government is said to have bounced the idea of the operation off the US Bush administration, although the latter declined to participate. U.S. intelligence officials claimed low confidence that the site was meant for weapons development. The suspected reactor was destroyed in the Israeli attack, which was suspected to have killed ten North Korean workers.

The attack did not cause an international outcry or any serious Syrian retaliatory moves as both parties tried to keep it secret: Israel didn't want publicity as regards its breach of the cease fire while Syria did not want to acknowledge the existence of its clandestine nuclear program.

Open nuclear programs 
Syria has attempted to purchase small research type nuclear reactors from China, Russia, Argentina, or other countries. Despite these attempted purchases being openly disclosed and IAEA monitored, international pressure led to all these purchases being cancelled. Syria had open and IAEA monitored nuclear research programs including a Chinese made non-reactor miniature neutron source.

On 26 November 2008 IAEA Board of Governors approved technical aid for Syria despite Western allegations that Syria had a secret atomic program that could eventually be used to make weapons. China, Russia and developing nations criticized Western "political interference" that they said undermined IAEA's program to foster civilian atomic energy development. The top U.N. nuclear official also strongly rebuked Western powers for trying to deny the request, saying this should not be done without evidence and merely on the existence of an investigation.

Alleged nuclear reactor

Bombing of alleged reactor

On 6 September 2007, Israel bombed an officially unidentified site in Syria which it believed had been a nuclear reactor under construction, in an operation called Operation Outside the Box. It was further claimed that the nuclear reactor was not yet operational and no nuclear material had been introduced into it. Top U.S. intelligence officials claimed that the site was meant for weapons development.

Western press reports asserted that the Israeli air strike followed a shipment delivery to Syria by a North Korean freighter, and that North Korea was suspected to be supplying a reactor to Syria for a nuclear weapons program. On 24 October 2007 the Institute for Science and International Security released a report which identified a site in eastern Syria's Deir ez-Zor Governorate province as the suspected reactor. The report speculated about similarities between the Syrian building and North Korea's Yongbyon Nuclear Scientific Research Center, but said that it was too early to make a definitive comparison. On 25 October 2007, Western media said the main building and any debris from it following the air strike had been completely dismantled and removed by the Syrians.

Reaction to allegations
On 23 June 2008, IAEA inspectors were allowed to visit the Dair Alzour site (also referred to as Al Kibar), and take samples of the debris. On 19 November 2008 an IAEA report stated that "a significant number of natural uranium particles" produced as a result of chemical processing were found at the Al Kibar site; however, the IAEA did not find sufficient evidence to prove Syria is developing nuclear weapons. Some American nuclear experts have speculated about similarities between the alleged Syrian reactor and North Korea's Yongybon reactor but IAEA Director General ElBaradei has pointed out that "there was uranium but it doesn't mean there was a reactor". ElBaradei has shown dissatisfaction with the United States and Israel for only providing the IAEA with photos of the bombed facility in Syria, and has also urged caution against prematurely judging Syria's atomic program by reminding diplomats about false U.S. claims that Saddam Hussein had weapons of mass destruction. Russia, China, Iran, and non-aligned countries have also supported giving Syria nuclear guidance despite pressure from the United States.

Joseph Cirincione, an expert on nuclear proliferation and head of the Washington-based Ploughshares Fund, commented "we should learn first from the past and be very cautious about any intelligence from the US about other country's weapons." Syria has denounced "the fabrication and forging of facts" in regards to the incident.

IAEA Director General Mohamed ElBaradei criticized the strikes and deplored that information regarding the matter had not been shared with his agency earlier. Syria has declined to let the IAEA visit other military sites the United States recently made allegations about, arguing it fears that too much openness on its part would encourage the U.S. to push for years of relentless international scrutiny. Syria has said it will voluntarily cooperate with the IAEA further if it isn't "at the expense of disclosing our military sites or causing a threat to our national security."

The Non-Aligned Movement has called for the establishment of a nuclear weapons free zone in the Middle East and called for a comprehensive multilaterally negotiated instrument which prohibits threats of attacks on nuclear facilities devoted to peaceful uses of nuclear energy. The Gulf Cooperation Council has also appealed for a nuclear weapons free Middle East and recognition of the right of a country to expertise in the field of nuclear energy for peaceful purposes. The IAEA has also approved a resolution urging all Middle East nations to renounce atomic bombs.

IAEA inspections 
After refusing to comment on the reports for six months, the Bush administration briefed Congress and the IAEA on 24 April 2008, saying that the U.S. Government was "convinced" that Syria had been building a "covert nuclear reactor" that was "not intended for peaceful purposes." The briefing included releases of satellite photographs of the bombed site and overhead and ground level intelligence photographs of the site under construction, including the alleged reactor vessel steel shell before concrete was poured and of the alleged reactor head structure.

On 27 April 2008, Syrian President Bashar al-Assad had said the Dair Alzour site was just "a military site under construction, not a nuclear site as Israel and America claimed," and that Syria's goal is a nuclear-free Middle East. Syria allowed an IAEA visit to the site on 23 June 2008, which took environmental samples that revealed the presence of man-made uranium and other materials consistent with a reactor. Syria refused IAEA requests for further information on or access to the Dair Alzour site.

A 2009 IAEA investigation reported evidence of uranium and graphite and concluded that the site bore features resembling an undeclared nuclear reactor. IAEA was initially unable to confirm or deny the nature of the site because, according to IAEA, Syria failed to provide necessary cooperation with the IAEA investigation. Syria has disputed these claims.

On 24 May 2011, IAEA Director General Amano released a report concluding that the destroyed building was "very likely" a nuclear reactor, which Syria had been required to declare under its NPT safeguards agreement. On 9 June 2011, IAEA Board of Governors voted 17-6 (with 11 abstentions) to report this as non-compliance to the UN Security Council.

Delivery systems 
The U.S. National Air and Space Intelligence Center reported in 2009 that Syria possessed road-mobile Scud-D and Tochka missiles, with fewer than 100 launchers. In addition Syria has aircraft and artillery delivery systems.

International partnerships
United States diplomatic cables revealed that two Indian firms aided Syrian chemical and biological weapon makers in trying to obtain Australia Group-controlled equipment. One cable stated that India "has a general obligation as a Chemical Weapons Convention State Party to never, under any circumstances, assist anyone in the development of chemical weapons".

In 2012, Iranian and North Korean officials and scientists were brought to bases and testing areas to aid in the development and use of chemical weapons.

In November 2014, the anti-government Syrian Observatory for Human Rights reported that five nuclear scientists, one of which that was Iranian national, were assassinated by a gunman in Damascus. The pro-government Al-Watan's account differed, reporting that "four nuclear scientists and electrical engineers" were killed. Al-Watan suggested the Nusra Front might be behind the attack; others suspect Israel.

See also 
 Syrian Scientific Studies and Research Center, The Syrian government agency and industrial complex, which according to security analysts and western intelligence agencies, is responsible for developing and manufacturing non-conventional weapons.
 Syria Accountability and Lebanese Sovereignty Restoration Act, a 2003 act of the 108th United States Congress which asserts that Syria's acquisition of weapons of mass destruction threatens the security of the Middle East and the national security interests of the United States

References

External links 
 Syria Special Weapons Guide at  globalsecurity.org
 Syria Profile at Nuclear Threat Initiative

Military of Syria
Syria
Nuclear weapons programs